Oleksy is a Polish-language surname, a regional spelling variant of the given name "Aleksy", or Alexius. 

Notable people with this surname include:

 Józef Oleksy (1946–2015), Polish politician
 Oleksy tapes
 Paweł Oleksy (born 1991), Polish football player
 Marcin Oleksy (born 1987), Polish amputee football player, 2022 FIFA Puskás Award winner
 Steven Oleksy (born 1986), American ice hockey player

See also
 Strzemieczne-Oleksy, village in Masovian Voivodeship, Poland
 Oleksiy, Ukrainian given name

References

Polish-language surnames